The Tour de Tunisie is a stage cycling race held annually in Tunisia since 1953. It is rated 2.2 and is part of UCI Africa Tour. The race was revived in 2016 after not being held since 2004.

Winners

References

Cycle races in Tunisia
1953 establishments in Tunisia
Recurring sporting events established in 1953
UCI Africa Tour races
Spring (season) events in Tunisia